Kristina Brandi (born March 29, 1977) is a former Puerto Rican tennis player. She was the first tennis player representing Puerto Rico to win a singles match in an Olympic tennis tournament.

Some of Brandi's career highlights: She achieved her best ranking in singles of 27 on 4 December 2000, and her high rank for doubles of 246 in June 1995. Brandi won one career singles title, in 1999 on grass at 's Hertogenbosch in the Netherlands.

Career

Early years
Brandi was born and raised in San Juan, Puerto Rico, where she became interested in the sport of tennis at an early age. She made her professional debut in 1995 when she was 17 years old. Her father is Joe Brandi, who coached Pete Sampras.

USTA Circuit
In 2003, Brandi won the most titles of any woman on the "USTA Circuit". She took home trophies from six events. Brandi was a member of the 2003 Puerto Rican Fed Cup team where she captured the singles championship at the $75k event in Albuquerque, New Mexico plus, the $50k event in Troy, Alabama and $25k in Peachtree City, Georgia.

2004 Olympics
Brandi represented Puerto Rico in the 2004 Summer Olympics in Athens, Greece. She became the first tennis player representing Puerto Rico to win a singles match in an Olympic tournament when she beat Jelena Kostanić from Croatia (7–5, 6–1). She lost in the second round to Russian Anastasia Myskina.

Later years
Kristina Brandi resides in Tampa, Florida and continued to be active on the WTA Tour for many years after the 2004 Olympic Games.

Brandi defended her ITF-Surbiton title defeating Laura Granville from the U.S. Brandi's grass-court season plans for 2006 at the WTA Tour-level included the main draw of the Birmingham tournament as well as the qualifying tournament at Eastbourne before heading to compete in the Wimbledon Championships main draw.

Brandi, who has since retired, is the niece of Andy Brandi who played for the Trinity Tigers men's tennis team in NCAA Division I competition.

WTA career finals

Singles: 1 (1 title)

ITF Circuit finals

Singles: 25 (16 titles, 9 runner-ups)

Doubles: 6 (1 title, 5 runner-ups)

See also

 List of Puerto Ricans
 Corsican immigration to Puerto Rico
 History of women in Puerto Rico
 Sports in Puerto Rico

References

External links
 
 
 

1977 births
Living people
Olympic tennis players of Puerto Rico
Puerto Rican people of Corsican descent
Puerto Rican female tennis players
Sportspeople from San Juan, Puerto Rico
Tennis players at the 2003 Pan American Games
Tennis players at the 2004 Summer Olympics
Tennis players at the 2007 Pan American Games
Pan American Games silver medalists for Puerto Rico
Pan American Games bronze medalists for Puerto Rico
Pan American Games medalists in tennis
Central American and Caribbean Games medalists in tennis
Central American and Caribbean Games gold medalists for Puerto Rico
Central American and Caribbean Games bronze medalists for Puerto Rico
Medalists at the 2003 Pan American Games